Somatidia nitida is a species of beetle in the family Cerambycidae. It was described by Broun in 1880. It contains the varietas Somatidia nitida var. variegata.

References

nitida
Beetles described in 1880